The 2018 Sud Ladies Cup (officially ) was the first edition of the Sud Ladies Cup women's football tournament. The tournament was named after Maurice Revello, who started the Toulon Tournament in 1967 and died in 2016. 

It was held in the region of Provence-Alpes-Côte d'Azur from 5 to 10 June 2018. All matches were played in Salon-de-Provence. Similar to the Toulon Tournament, the tournament was contested by under-20 national teams.

United States defeated Germany, Haiti and France to sweep all three games and won their first title.

Participants
Four participating teams were announced on 9 April 2018. All they were qualified for 2018 FIFA U-20 Women's World Cup

CONCACAF
 (1st participation)
 (1st participation)

UEFA
 (1st participation)
 (1st participation)

Squads

Match officials
The referees were:

 Victoria Beyer
Assistants: Solenne Bartnik and Stéphanie Di Benedetto
 Berline Geffrard
Assistants: Falone Dieurisma and Anne-Marie Joseph

 Katja Koroleva
Assistants: Deleana Quan and Felisha Mariscal

Results

Goalscorers
26 goals were scored in 6 matches, for an average of  goals per match.
4 goals
 Sophia Smith
3 goals

 Emelyne Laurent
 Ashley Sanchez

2 goals

 Kelly Gago
 Laura Freigang
 Erin Gilroy
 Penelope Hocking

1 goal

 Maëlle Lakrar
 Océane Ringenbach
 Luca Maria Graf
 Stefanie Sanders
 Roseline Éloissaint
 Abi Kim
 Brianna Pinto

Own goal
 Tanja Pawollek (playing against France)

Awards
After the final, the following players were rewarded for their performances during the competition.

Best player:  Sophia Smith
Best goalkeeper:  Mylène Chavas
Topscorer:  Sophia Smith
Fair play:

See also
2018 Toulon Tournament

References

External links 
 Sud Ladies Cup

2018 in women's association football
2018 in youth association football
2017–18 in French women's football
June 2018 sports events in France
Sud Ladies Cup